Harouna Ilboudo (born 31 December 1986) is a Burkinabé cyclist.

Palmares

2011
1st Overall Boucle du Coton
1st Stage 2
2013
1st Stages 1 & 4 Tour du Togo
2014
1st Overall Tour du Togo
2016
1st Overall Tour du Faso

References

1986 births
Living people
Burkinabé male cyclists
21st-century Burkinabé people